Łady  is a village in the administrative district of Gmina Raszyn, within Pruszków County, Masovian Voivodeship, in east-central Poland.

In 1827, the village had a population of 60.

References

Villages in Pruszków County